Herbert J. Wright (November 9, 1946 – August 24, 2005) was a science fiction author and television director and producer. He was born in Keokuk, Iowa. His most notable works were Star Trek: The Next Generation and War of the Worlds. He directed a few episodes of the latter series and wrote and directed the season finale "The Angel of Death," which guest-starred his second wife Elaine Giftos. Among Star Trek fans he is known as the "Father of the Ferengi" and was known for his unique storytelling that he himself called "weird shit."

Other works include Rod Serling's Night Gallery, Cadillacs and Dinosaurs, Stingray, Hunter, McCloud, and the Flipper revival series.

After he graduated from Yale with honors, Wright moved to Hollywood to begin working in the filmmaking industry. He also studied in Japan as an exchange student, during which he met with director Akira Kurosawa, and began his lifelong study of martial arts.

He also worked on (off television) Mars and Beyond, which featured Giftos and was distributed on his Cyber Sci-Fi Network.

Wright had a strong friendship with Gene Roddenberry. The two met while Roddenberry was making The Questor Tapes. He showed a great interest in the story, and was going to contribute to the series that was planned to follow. However, the project fell apart due to Roddenberry's conflicts with the studio. Though Roddenberry considered the series to be dead, the concept stuck with Wright, who had hopes that it could be revived. When the rights finally fell back to the Roddenberry family in the 2000s, Wright secured the option to the property and set out to produce the series, updating it while still staying true to Roddenberry's vision. During the initial production stages, Wright became ill and died of prostate cancer in Woodland Hills, California, on August 24, 2005, at age 58.

References

External links

1947 births
2005 deaths
American television directors
American television writers
American male television writers
People from Columbus, Indiana
Screenwriters from Indiana
20th-century American screenwriters
20th-century American male writers
Television producers from Indiana